Stephen Williams (born 23 October 1967) was an English cricketer. He was a right-handed batsman and right-arm medium-pace bowler who played for Cornwall. He was born in Redruth.

Having made his Minor Counties Championship debut during the 1988 season, Williams made List A debut in the 1995 season, against Middlesex, scoring a commendable 48 runs, the highest score of the Cornwall team.

Williams' impressive form followed into his next game, scoring his List A best of 52 runs, his only half-century.

Taking the next two seasons out of the game, Williams played two further List A matches, in 1999 and 2000.

External links
Stephen Williams at Cricket Archive

1967 births
Living people
People from Redruth
English cricketers
Cornwall cricketers